Pete Nash is a game designer who has worked primarily on role-playing games.

Career
Pete Nash had worked on Chaosium fanzines. In 2008, Mongoose Publishing tried out two game lines intended to support Wizards of the Coast's fourth edition Dungeons & Dragons, one of which was Wraith Recon by Nash.

Nash and Lawrence Whitaker decided to revamp Mongoose's RuneQuest game and thus they released RuneQuest II. Nash's Wraith Recon fantasy warfare setting received new support in RQII. After Mongoose's license to RuneQuest expired, Mongoose kept the game in print under the title Legend. Meanwhile, Whitaker and Nash formed a company, The Design Mechanism, to pick up the RuneQuest license and publish a sixth edition of the game in 2012. That edition remained in print until 2016, when it was retitled Mythras.

Nash has also worked for Alephtar Games.

References

External links
 

Living people
Place of birth missing (living people)
Role-playing game designers
Year of birth missing (living people)